Ornativalva zonella is a moth of the family Gelechiidae. It was described by Pierre Chrétien in 1917. It is found in Algeria, Tunisia, Israel, Saudi Arabia, southern Iran and China (Xinjiang).

Adults have been recorded on wing from March to June.

References

Moths described in 1917
Ornativalva